Team McDonalds Down Under is a UCI Continental team founded in 2018 that is based in Australia, gaining UCI Continental status in the same year.

2018 Team roster

References

UCI Continental Teams (Oceania)
Cycling teams based in Australia
Cycling teams established in 2018